Camden Underworld, London – 16 November 2001 (colloquially referred to as Live at Camden Underworld) is a split live video album by Gainesville, Florida-based melodic hardcore band As Friends Rust and Richmond, Virginia-based punk rock band Strike Anywhere. The concert was filmed on November 16, 2001 at the Underworld in Camden Town, London, England. The event was part of a five-week European and United Kingdom tour shared by the two bands while promoting their debut full-length albums: As Friends Rust's Won (released through Doghouse Records and Defiance Records) and Strike Anywhere's Change Is a Sound (released through Jade Tree).   

The live footage was first edited and uploaded online through PunkBand TV in late January 2002. It was later released by Punkervision on DVD and VHS on December 17, 2002. The home video was released three months after As Friends Rust ceased to exist; the band having changed name to Salem in September 2002.

Background and production 

In 2001, both As Friends Rust and Strike Anywhere recorded their first full-length albums. The two bands had previously toured the United States together the year prior, during a four-week tour that spanned from May 29 to June 30, 2000. In April 2001, Strike Anywhere recorded its album Change Is a Sound, which was later released on August 14, 2001 through American record label Jade Tree. In July 2001, As Friends Rust recorded its album Won, which was later released in the United States on October 23, 2001 through American record label Doghouse Records; it was also licensed to German record label Defiance Records for release in Europe and the United Kingdom on October 15, 2001.

In promotion of their first full-length albums, As Friends Rust and Strike Anywhere re-teamed for a five-week tour of Europe and the United Kingdom, which spanned from October 29 to December 5, 2001. Peoria, Illinois-based post-hardcore band Planes Mistaken for Stars joined the two bands for the first leg of the European tour. This later turned out to be vocalist Damien Moyal's final tour with As Friends Rust, as he quit the band three months later.

Midway through the tour, on November 16, 2001, As Friends Rust, Strike Anywhere and Austrian punk rock band Red Lights Flash played a sold-out show at the Underworld in Camden Town, London, England. As Friends Rust had previously played the venue twice; the first time on July 30, 1999, and then again on August 21, 2000 with Canadian melodic hardcore band Grade; and would play it again during its reunion tour on August 18, 2008.

The highlight performance was filmed using a multi-camera setup by Peter Wells, Margaret Wells, Philip Wells and Ray Liffen. The team of videographers operated the website PunkBand TV, where they uploaded and shared its live footage of independent bands that played in London. The Wells' edited As Friends Rust's, Strike Anywhere's and Red Lights Flash's live footage in early January 2002 and posted two songs from each band on the PunkBand TV website later that same month. The videos included "Coffee Black" by As Friends Rust and "No Reply" and "P(owerful) C(hoices)" by Red Lights Flash. The chemistry shared between As Friends Rust and Strike Anywhere on tour also gave talk to releasing a split single of the two bands, but it never materialized.

Later in 2002, the Wells' decided to start a home video distribution company to sell the shows they filmed and formed Punkervision. As Friends Rust and Strike Anywhere were selected as the second video production for release by Punkervision (Red Lights Flash's footage was not included on the home video). The complete concerts were fully edited and released on video home system and digital video disc on December 17, 2002. The two formats were available in both PAL and NTSC encoding systems. Although Strike Anywhere was still an active band at the time of the video's release, As Friends Rust had had a considerable change in membership and opted to change name to Salem in September 2002.

Critical reception 
Camden Underworld, London – 16 November 2001 received overall positive critical acclaim upon release. Critics praised the quality of the video and audio footage, the multi-camera setup and the professional editing. The user-friendly menu on the DVD was also complimented but some mentioned that bonus features would have been a nice addition. As Friends Rust and Strike Anywhere were both lauded for playing energetic and captivating shows.

Track listing
Credits are adapted from the video's liner notes.

Personnel 
Credits are adapted from the video's liner notes.

As Friends Rust
 Damien Moyal – lead vocals
 Joseph Simmons – guitar
 Christopher Beckham – guitar and backing vocals
 Thomas  Rankine – bass guitar
 Zachary Swain – drums

Strike Anywhere
 Thomas Barnett – lead vocals
 Matt C. Sherwood – guitar
 Matt Smith – guitar
 Garth Petrie – bass guitar
 Eric Kane – drums

Production
 Peter Wells – producer, director, cinematographer, editor
 Margaret Wells – producer, cinematographer, sound recordist
 Philip Wells – cinematographer
 Ray Liffen – cinematographer

Release history

References

External links 
 
 
 
 

2002 live albums
2002 video albums
As Friends Rust albums
Live emo albums
Live hardcore punk albums
Live punk rock albums
Live video albums
Melodic hardcore video albums
Split albums
Strike Anywhere albums